Michelle Ramaglia (born Claudia Michelle Ramaglia Zavala on May 18, 1978, in Mexico City, Distrito Federal, Mexico) is a Mexican actress.

Raised in San Miguel de Allende, Guanajuato and having been interested in acting since her childhood, Michelle Ramaglia decided to enroll in Televisa's Centro de Educación Artística (CEA), where thanks to her talent, she first received small roles in various episodes of Mujer, casos de la vida real. She became well known in 2004, with her participation in the telenovela Mujer de Madera, produced by Emilio Larrosa, where she played Virginia "Vicky" Galván. Ramaglia's most recent work was in Código Postal, Al Diablo con los Guapos with "Corazon Salvaje" and La que no podia amar.

Soap operas
 Simplemente María (2015–16) .... Crispina Jaramillo "Pina"
 La Malquerida (2014) .... Nuria Vásquez (villain)
 Corazón indomable (2013) ... Aracely
 La que no podía amar (2011-12) .... Consuelo Herrera
 Rafaela (2011) - Felipa (villain)
 Cuando me enamoro (2010-11) -Priscila
 Corazón salvaje (2009-10) - Lulú
 Al diablo con los guapos (2007-2008) .... Adelina "Lina"
 Código postal (2006-2007) .... Daniela Gutiérrez Santos
 Mujer, casos de la vida real (2003-2005)
 Mujer de madera (2004-2005) .... Vicky Galván "Perla"
 Amarte es mi pecado (2004) .... Azafata
 Velo de novia (2003) .... Enfermera
 Mi destino eres tú (2000) .... Invitada en boda

References

External links

1978 births
Living people
Mexican telenovela actresses
Mexican television actresses
Actresses from Mexico City
Actresses from Guanajuato
People from San Miguel de Allende
21st-century Mexican actresses
Mexican people of Italian descent